Sos Sargsyan (24 October 1929 – 26 September 2013) was a prominent Armenian actor, director and writer.

Biography
Sos Sargsyan was born in Stepanavan in northern Armenia, at the time part of the Soviet Union. He moved to Yerevan in 1948 and started to perform at the Theater of the Young Spectator. He graduated from the Fine Arts and Theater Institute in 1954 as an actor. Between 1954 and 1991 he performed at the Sundukyan State Academic Theatre of Yerevan.

In October 1991, a month after Armenia's independence from the Soviet Union, Sargsyan took part in the first presidential election in independent Armenia. He was nominated by the Armenian Revolutionary Federation. In 1991 he established the Hamazgayin (Pan-National) Theater, which he headed until his death. From 1997 to 2006 he was the rector of the Yerevan Cinema and Theatre Institute. Sargsyan died on 26 September 2013 in Yerevan. Sargsyan's funeral was held on 29 September in attendance of Armenia's President Serzh Sargsyan and thousands of people. He was buried at the Komitas Pantheon.

Career
Sargsyan started acting in 1947. Some of his most notable roles include Don Quixote, Iago, King John, King Lear, etc. He starred in over 40 films, mostly Armenian. Besides Armenian films he has starred in a number of Russian films, most notable of which is Solaris (1972), directed by Andrei Tarkovsky.

Filmography

1960: Guys from the Army Band as Artashes (uncredited)
1962: Tchanaparh as Dayan
1966: Msyo Zhake yev urishner as Priest (segment "The Priest's Promise")
1967: Triangle as varpet Mkrtich
1968: Aprum er mi mard
1969: We and Our Mountains as Lieutenant
1971: Heghnar spring as varpet Mkrtich
1972: Khatabala as Zambakhov
1972: Solaris as Dr. Gibarian
1974: Hndzan as Vardan
1974: Qaos as Smbat Alimyan
1975: Zhayre as Hayrapet
1976: I togda ty vernyoshsya as Babayan
1977: Yerkunq as Murza
1977: Sobstvennoe mnenie as Ashot Gasparyan
1977: Nahapet as Nahapet
1978: Star Of Hope as Movses
1978: Komissiya po rassledovaniyu
1979: The Best Half of Life
1979: Goluboy lev as «Yuvelir»
1980: Beyond The Seven Mountains as Hovsep
1981: Dzori Miro as Miro
1982: Gikor as Hambo
1984: Sans Famille (TV Movie) as Vitalis
1985: Apple Garden as Martin
1985: Tchermak anurjner as Hakob
1985: Khndzori aygin as Martin
1986: Pod znakom odnorogoy korovy
1987: Yeghishe Charents – Known and Unknown Sides
1988: Kvartet as Petros
1988: Pharmacy On The Corner as Adamyan
1988: Vozneseniye
1989: I povtoritsya vsyo
1992: Where Have You Been, Man of God? (TV Mini-Series) as Stepham Yesayan
2001: And There Was Light
2001: The Merry Bus as priest
2006: Mayak as Grandfather

References

External links

 

Armenian male film actors
1929 births
2013 deaths
People from Stepanavan
Male actors from Yerevan
Writers from Yerevan